Attitudinal psyche is a theory of personality that describes dispositions towards four main aspects of life: logic, physics, emotions, and volition. The typology contains 24 types containing the following aspects:

Psychosofia (or psyche yoga) is the rough English translation of the personality theory developed by the Russian author, Alexander Y. Afanasyev, in his book, Syntax of Love.

Personality typologies
Personality tests